Keshu Ramsay (1955–2010) was a producer and director of Bollywood films. He was one of the Ramsay Brothers, a group of siblings who worked as directors, producers and editors in the Bollywood industry. His brothers are Shyam Ramsay, Kumar Ramsay, Tulsi Ramsay and Kiran Ramsay. He is major the producer of Khiladi series

Filmography

Producer

Director
Films

TV series
Saaya (1989)

Cinematographer

Actor

Assistant Director

Assistant camera

References

1955 births
2010 deaths
Hindi-language film directors
Hindi film producers
20th-century Indian film directors